Einar Rossbach (born 20 October 1964) is a former Norwegian international goalkeeper who played for Urædd, Ham-Kam, Tromsø, Lyn, Odd, Silkeborg, Tollnes and Pors Grenland. He was named goalkeeper of the year in both 1987 and in 1990, and received a Kniksen award in 1990 as "Goalkeeper of the year". VG named him "player of the year" in 1990.

Playing career
Rossbach started his career with local clubs Stridklev, Urædd and Pors Grenland. In 1986 when Ham-Kam was promoted to the Norwegian Premier League they signed Rossbach. In 1990 Rossbach moved to Tromsø, and became part of the Tromsø team who finished second in the top flight. After a year in Tromsø Rossbach moved to Oslo to play for Lyn and to attend the Norwegian Police University College. Rossbach have made comebacks for both Tollnes and Pors Grenland when the clubs struggled with injuries on their goalies, the last time in 2004, when he at the age of 39, guarded the goal in the first games of the season. He's currently working at Grenland police station.

Rossback was capped six times for Norway, and also capped at U19 and U21 level.

Personal life
His son, Sondre Rossbach, is goalkeeper for Odds BK in the Norwegian Premier League. Concurrently with his son's Odd career, Einar Rossbach was the goalkeeper coach of Odd from 2008 to 2020.

External links

References

1964 births
Living people
Sportspeople from Porsgrunn
Norwegian footballers
Norway youth international footballers
Norway under-21 international footballers
Norway international footballers
Pors Grenland players
Hamarkameratene players
Tromsø IL players
Lyn Fotball players
Silkeborg IF players
Odds BK players
Kniksen Award winners
Eliteserien players
Norwegian First Division players
Danish Superliga players
Norwegian expatriate footballers
Expatriate men's footballers in Denmark
Norwegian expatriate sportspeople in Denmark
Association football goalkeepers
Odds BK non-playing staff
Association football goalkeeping coaches